John Wele was Archdeacon of Barnstaple from 1309 to 1312.

References

Archdeacons of Barnstaple